Tatak Pilipino was a weekly cultural magazine show of ABS-CBN. It aired from November 3, 1990, to 1995. It was hosted by Gel Santos-Relos and APO Hiking Society's Jim Paredes.

Overview
Tatak Pilipino was premiered on November 3, 1990, it was hosted by Gel Santos-Relos and APO Hiking Society's Jim Paredes. The program was focused on the topics and features related to the Filipinos.

In 1994, the program was moved to Thursday night and its reformatted as a magazine variety show with a new title Tatak Pilipino: Bagong Yugto.

Hosts
Gel Santos-Relos
Jim Paredes

Guest Hosts
Audie Gemora
Eula Valdez
Nanette Inventor

Re-runs
This program is formerly aired on Friday Mornings at 6:30 AM on Jeepney TV.

Awards and recognitions
Winner, Best Cultural Magazine Show - PMPC Star Awards for TV (1991, 1992, 1993 & 1994)
Winner, Best Cultural Magazine Show Host - PMPC Star Awards for TV (1991, 1992, 1993 & 1994)

See also
List of shows previously aired by ABS-CBN
List of programs broadcast by Jeepney TV

References

Philippine documentary television series
1990 Philippine television series debuts
1995 Philippine television series endings
ABS-CBN original programming
Filipino-language television shows